Federal Route 220, consisting of Jalan Paya Terubong and Jalan Dato Ismail Hashim (formerly Penang State Route P11 and P6), is a federal road in Penang, Malaysia.

Features

At most sections, the Federal Route 220 was built under the JKR R5 road standard, allowing maximum speed limit of up to 90 km/h.

List of junctions

References

Malaysian Federal Roads